Crepidodera aurea is a species of flea beetles from Chrysomelidae family that can be found in everywhere in Europe, except for Albania, Andorra, Finland, Ireland, Latvia, Moldova, Monaco, Norway, San Marino, Sweden, Vatican City, and various European islands.

References

Beetles described in 1785
Beetles of Europe
Alticini
Taxa named by Étienne Louis Geoffroy